Schricker is a surname originally from Germany. Notable people with the surname include:

 Henry Frederick Schricker (1883–1966), former governor of Indiana
 Ivo Wolfgang Eduard Schricker (1877–1962), German footballer

German-language surnames
Occupational surnames